Stefan or Stjepan Ilija Verković was a 19th-century Bosnian ethnographer and folklorist. Born to Bosnian Croat parents, he identified as South Slav and initially he supported the Serbian and later the Bulgarian national cause.

Biography
Verković was born in Ugljari, Ottoman Empire on March 5, 1821. He passed his education in the Franciscan school of Tolisa (1830–1833), and then studied philosophy and theology in Zagreb University, where he was influenced by the ideas of the Illyrian movement. In 1843, he contacted the Serbian government and in the following years he served secret missions in parts of today Croatia, Montenegro, Kosovo and Serbia, then under Austrian or Ottoman rule. During his tours through the Balkan lands he searched for medieval Slavonic manuscripts, antique coins and various antiques, recorded folk songs and customs.

In 1848 he met in Belgrade Ilija Garašanin and adopted his pan-Serbian ideas. Subsequently, he refused a job in the Serbian state administration, and in 1850 he moved to Serres in the Ottoman Empire, where he spent nearly 20 years. In 1862 he agreed to become an agent of the Serbian government in the Ottoman Empire, and to study the regional Slavic folklore in Macedonia and Thrace. His secret mission was to help Macedonian Slavs to be considered Serb, rather than Greeks, and thus helping to resolve the Eastern Question. Since then, until 1875, Verkovic has regularly sent secret reports to the Serbian government. He regularly supplied also coins from the area to Copenhagen, Paris, London and the Hermitage. Verković became then also a member of SANU.

During the years he lived in Ottoman Empire, Verković proved to be a scientist in the field of folklore, ethnography and geography. He еstablished intensive contacts with dozens of Bulgarian national movement activists, becoming their associate. After 1868 his close ties with the local Slavic population led him to a progressive dissociation from the official position of Belgrade, that there lived a Serbs. Verković issued a collection called "Folk Songs of the Macedonian Bulgarians" in Belgrade in 1860. He noted in the introduction that the title was chosen, because the locals identified themselves as Bulgarian. In addition, owing to his collector's zeal, Verkovich saved a great number of old manuscripts, coins, objects of art, etc. His main and largest work is "Veda Slovena" in two volumes, 1874 and 1881. This sensational Slavic Veda contained “Bulgarian folk songs of the pre-historical and pre-Christian times, discovered in Thrace and Macedonia”. During the Russian-Turkish war of 1877-78 he moved to Russia, where he lived till 1891. Nevertheless, the scarcity here urged him to sell some artifacts of his antique collection.

In 1891, Verkovic came to Bulgaria and for his merits to the Bulgarian people he was granted a  pension for life from the National Assembly. He despaired at the increasing distrust on his life's work, "Veda Slovena", which many took to be a hoax. With the cooperation of government, he settled in Plovdiv. From here he undertook in 1892 - 1893, two trips among the Pomaks in the Western Rhodopes, trying to prove the authenticity of this Bulgarian folk songs collection. But his mission failed. He prepared a subsequent manuscript to publish also the third volume of "Veda Slovena". However, without financial support he deceased in Sofia several months later.

References

Folklorists
Ethnographers
Numismatists
19th-century scientists
Bosnia and Herzegovina scientists
Croats of Bosnia and Herzegovina
Serbs of Bosnia and Herzegovina
Members of the Serbian Academy of Sciences and Arts
Bulgarian folklorists
1821 births
1893 deaths